Events in the year 1876 in Iceland.

Incumbents 

 Monarch: Christian IX
 Minister for Iceland: Johannes Nellemann

Events 

 Frederik Johnstrup led an expedition to Iceland to study Askja and the volcanoes at Mývatn with Þorvaldur Thoroddsen (1855–1921) as his guide.

Births 

 4 March − Ásgrímur Jónsson, painter
 10 March − Edvard Eriksen, sculptor

References 

 
1870s in Iceland
Years of the 19th century in Iceland
Iceland
Iceland